Shizishan District is a former district under the administration of Tongling City, Anhui Province, People's Republic of China. The district's postal code is 244031.It was merged with Tongguanshan District to form Tongguan District in October 2015.

Administrative divisions

Shizishan District administers four streets and one town. The streets include Shizishan Street, Xinmiao Street, Fenghuangshan Street, and Fanshan Street. The town is Dongjiao.

County-level divisions of Anhui